The 1995–96 NBA season was the Kings' 47th season in the National Basketball Association, and 11th season in Sacramento. During the off-season, the Kings acquired Šarūnas Marčiulionis from the Seattle SuperSonics, and acquired Tyrone Corbin from the Atlanta Hawks. The Kings would play their best basketball winning their first five games of the season. However, things turned ugly as a brawl occurred in a 119–95 road win over the Indiana Pacers on November 10, 1995, with a total of 16 players, eight from each team suspended. The team played above .500 for the first half of the season, holding a 24–20 record at the All-Star break. However, after a 24–17 start, the Kings struggled losing eleven straight games in February, as they traded Corbin and Walt Williams to the Miami Heat in exchange for Billy Owens and Kevin Gamble. Despite their struggles, the Kings would finally end their nine-year playoff drought by winning 9 of their final 15 games. They would capture the eighth and final playoff spot in the Western Conference with a 39–43 record, fifth in the Pacific Division.

Mitch Richmond averaged 23.1 points and 1.5 steals per game, and was named to the All-NBA Third Team, while being selected for the 1996 NBA All-Star Game. In addition, second-year forward Brian Grant averaged 14.4 points, 7.0 rebounds and 1.3 blocks per game, while Olden Polynice provided the team with 12.2 points and 9.4 rebounds per game, and second round draft pick Tyus Edney provided with 10.8 points and 6.1 assists per game, and was selected to the NBA All-Rookie Second Team. Off the bench, Marčiulionis contributed 10.8 points per game, but only played 53 games due to a knee injury, and second-year forward Michael Smith averaged 5.5 points and 6.0 rebounds per game.

In the Western Conference First Round of the playoffs, the Kings faced off against the top-seeded Seattle SuperSonics. Despite winning Game 2 on the road, 90–81, the Kings would lose the series in four games as Richmond sprained his ankle in Game 4, which the Kings lost at home, 101–87 to the Sonics. It was also their only playoff appearance with Richmond on the team. The Sonics would reach the NBA Finals, but would lose in six games to the Chicago Bulls. 

Following the season, Marčiulionis was traded to the Denver Nuggets after only playing just one season with the Kings.

Draft picks

Roster

Regular season

Season standings

z – clinched conference title
y – clinched division title
x – clinched playoff spot

Record vs. opponents

Playoffs

|- align="center" bgcolor="#ffcccc"
| 1
| April 26
| @ Seattle
| L 85–97
| Mitch Richmond (18)
| Olden Polynice (9)
| Mitch Richmond (4)
| KeyArena17,072
| 0–1
|- align="center" bgcolor="#ccffcc"
| 2
| April 28
| @ Seattle
| W 90–81
| Mitch Richmond (37)
| Olden Polynice (16)
| Owens, Marciulionis (5)
| KeyArena17,072
| 1–1
|- align="center" bgcolor="#ffcccc"
| 3
| April 30
| Seattle
| L 89–96
| Mitch Richmond (24)
| Olden Polynice (14)
| Billy Owens (6)
| ARCO Arena17,317
| 1–2
|- align="center" bgcolor="#ffcccc"
| 4
| May 2
| Seattle
| L 87–101
| Lionel Simmons (24)
| Polynice, Smith (9)
| Lionel Simmons (3)
| ARCO Arena17,317
| 1–3
|-

Player statistics

NOTE: Please write the players statistics in alphabetical order by last name.

Season

Playoffs

Awards and records
 Mitch Richmond, NBA All-Star Game
 Mitch Richmond, All-NBA Third Team
 Tyus Edney, NBA All-Rookie 2nd Team

Transactions

Trades

Player Transactions Citation:

References

See also
 1995–96 NBA season

Sacramento Kings seasons
Sacramento
Sacramento
Sacramento